Split Lake is a lake on the Nelson River in Manitoba, Canada. The settlement of Split Lake is located on a peninsula on the northern shore. The lake is about 46 km (29 miles) long.

The Burntwood River and the Nelson River flows into the west end of Split Lake. The Grass River joins the Nelson just before it enters the lake. The Nelson flows east out from the east end of the lake, flowing into the Clark Lake.

The Hudson's Bay Company had a temporary post here in 1798–99.

References 

Lakes of Manitoba